King of the Ritz is a 1933 British musical film directed by Carmine Gallone and Herbert Smith and starring Stanley Lupino, Betty Stockfeld and Hugh Wakefield. A separate French-language version King of the Hotel was made, with Stockfield appearing in both films.

Song words by Clifford Grey (Original words by Serge Veber). Music by Raoul Moretti.... song titles "You'll Fall in Love"......"Loving You Brings Me Gladness"

Plot summary
While working at a top hotel, the head porter falls in love with a wealthy female guest.

Cast
 Stanley Lupino as Claude King 
 Betty Stockfeld as Mrs. Cooper 
 Hugh Wakefield as King of Blitz 
 Henry Kendall as Teddy Smith 
 Gina Malo as Victoria 
 Gibb McLaughlin as Baron Popov 
 Harry Milton as  Alonso 
 John Singer as Pageboy

References

External links

1933 films
British musical films
Films directed by Carmine Gallone
Films directed by Herbert Smith
1933 musical films
British multilingual films
British films based on plays
British black-and-white films
Films scored by Jack Beaver
1933 multilingual films
1930s English-language films
1930s British films